Ibolya Korodi (born 18 July 1957) is a Romanian former sprinter of Hungarian descent. She competed in the women's 4 × 400 metres relay at the 1980 Summer Olympics.

References

1957 births
Living people
Athletes (track and field) at the 1980 Summer Olympics
Romanian female sprinters
Olympic athletes of Romania
Romanian sportspeople of Hungarian descent
Place of birth missing (living people)
Olympic female sprinters
Universiade medalists in athletics (track and field)
Universiade bronze medalists for Romania